Orandelbinia is  a bounded rural locality of Warrumbungle Shire and a civil parish of Gowen County, New South Wales.

Orandelbinia, New South Wales is located at  31°32′54″S 149°11′04″E.

History
Before European settlement the Weilwan were the traditional custodians of Orandelbinia parish.

The parish of Orandelbinia was based on the Orandelbinia Run established in the 19th century.

References

Localities in New South Wales
Geography of New South Wales
Central West (New South Wales)